On 6 July 1893, Prince George, Duke of York (later King George V), and Princess Victoria Mary of Teck (later Queen Mary) were married at the Chapel Royal, St. James's Palace, in London, England.

Engagement
Princess Victoria Mary of Teck's engagement to Prince Albert Victor, Duke of Clarence and Avondale, eldest son of the Prince of Wales, ended with the duke's death on 14 January 1892. Even before the duke's death, his grandmother Queen Victoria had wanted to ensure the succession, and consequently desired that his younger brother and (now second-in-line to the throne) Prince George marry either Princess Marie or Princess Victoria Melita of Edinburgh. For his part, George was fond of his cousins, but did not want to marry early; "I still think marrying too young is a bad thing," he wrote to the Queen, and cited the circumstances surrounding the death of Rudolf, Crown Prince of Austria, as an example. Furthermore, the prince made it known, "The one thing I never could do is to marry a person that didn't care for me. I should be miserable for the rest of my life". In 1892 however, a tentative proposal of marriage was put forward to Marie's parents, but as she was influenced by her Anglophobe mother and governess, Marie rejected him.

His grandmother Queen Victoria was fond of the Duke of Clarence's fiancée, and made known her wish for Mary to wed his brother George (now the Duke of York). The situation was embarrassing for the couple, as the country expected their engagement and contemporary newspapers speculated wildly on the affair. Mary was still mourning the duke's death, but faced the intense pressure of her parents, among others. George on the other hand was faced with the reality of his new position as second-in-line to the throne, and had lost self-confidence after Marie's refusal. He had no idea what Mary's real opinion was towards him, and consequently had some misgivings; George was urged to propose to Mary after spending time with his beloved aunt Queen Olga of the Hellenes. Despite this background, the couple came to care deeply for each other, and their marriage would be a success.

Several awkward encounters with Prince George went by, always in the company of others, with both individuals remaining embarrassed and shy. On 3 May 1893, Mary arranged to have tea with George's sister Princess Louise, Duchess of Fife, and her husband, but when she arrived, she found George there as well. The awkward moment was saved after Louise interceded, "Now Georgie, don't you think you ought to take May into the garden to look at the frogs in the pond?" George proposed beside the pond, and their engagement was officially announced the following day.

Protests
The Socialist League, an anarchist group, campaigned against the cost of the wedding, putting up posters which stated: "The London Anarchists will hold an indignation meeting Sunday, July 2nd, in Hyde Park, at half-past-three, to protest against the waste of wealth upon these Royal Vermin, while the workers are dying of hunger and overwork.  Fellow workers, prepare for the Revolution.  Remember - He who would be free himself must strike the blow.  Down with Flunkyism."  Thomas Cantwell and Ernest Young, members of the group, were caught flyposting and were arrested and held in prison.  Their offices were searched, but the case was ultimately dismissed.

Wedding

Prince George, Duke of York, and Princess Victoria Mary of Teck were married at 12:30 on 6 July 1893 at the Chapel Royal at St James's Palace.  Their wedding was the first royal wedding to take place in St James's Chapel since the death of Prince Albert in 1861, which plunged Queen Victoria into deep mourning. Most of Albert and Victoria's own children were married in St George's Chapel, Windsor Castle, in relative seclusion.

On the morning of their wedding, George accidentally caught sight of his fiancée down a long corridor of Buckingham Palace; he proceeded to make a "low and courtly bow," a gesture Mary never forgot.

The royal parties were brought from Buckingham Palace to St James's in four large carriage processions, consisting of open landaus. The first procession included members of the household; this was followed by the Duke of York and his supporters in the second and Princess Mary, the Duke of Teck and Prince Adolphus of Teck in the third. The final procession included Queen Victoria, the Duchess of Teck and Princes Frederick and Alexander of Teck. The first public royal wedding in 32 years drew large numbers of spectators, many of whom gathered in the route from Buckingham Palace to St James's Palace to give the couple an "enthusiastic reception". Mary greeted the crowds' applause with her "side-ways smile," and with "a little nervous gesture of her white-gloved right hand".

Princess Victoria Mary was attended by five bridesmaids and five junior bridesmaids: George's sisters Princesses Victoria and Maud of Wales; and his first cousins Princesses Victoria Melita, Alexandra, and Beatrice of Edinburgh; Princesses Margaret and Patricia of Connaught; Princesses Alice and Victoria Eugenie of Battenberg; and Princess Helena Victoria of Schleswig-Holstein. The Duke of York's two supporters were the Prince of Wales and the Duke of Edinburgh.

The Archbishop of Canterbury performed the ceremony, and was assisted by the Bishop of London, the Bishop of Rochester, and five other prelates. George and Mary then proceeded to Buckingham Palace, where Queen Victoria made a rare public appearance on the balcony along with the Duke and Duchess. The marriage register was signed by the Queen, the prime minister, and all other royal personages present.

Upon their marriage, Mary became styled as Her Royal Highness The Duchess of York. They spent their honeymoon at Sandringham, the Prince of Wales' estate in Norfolk, before going to Osborne House to stay with the Queen.

Wedding dress

Upon the announcement of the engagement, Arthur Silver of the Silver Studio, was approached to design the wedding dress. Silver had designed the dress for Princess Mary's intended wedding to the Duke of Clarence and Avondale, in 1892. This 'Lily of the Valley' creation had been made public just days before the Duke of Clarence's untimely death in January 1892 but had to be completely abandoned. The design chosen for the York-Teck wedding was 'The May Silks'; the dress would feature embroidery of the emblems of a rose, shamrock and thistle, and be trimmed with the traditional orange blossom and true lovers knots.

The dress itself was put together by Linton and Curtis of Albemarle Street, London. The front of the dress was made of white satin, featuring three small flounces old Honiton lace which had been used on the wedding dress of her mother. The bodice, cut at the throat, was long and pointed and was made of white and silver brocade, also featuring a small amount of her mother's Honiton lace near the top and on the upper part of the sleeve. The veil, previously used by her mother was fastened with diamond pins gifted by Queen Victoria. Matching the orange blossom elements to the dress, small wreaths were placed all the way around the bust and on the hair. Princess Mary completed the wedding outfit with a diamond tiara from Queen Victoria; diamond rivière necklace from the Prince and Princess of Wales; and diamond earrings and anchor brooch, a wedding gift from Prince George.

Guests

Groom's family
 The Queen of the United Kingdom, the groom's paternal grandmother
 The Prince and Princess of Wales, the groom's parents
 Princess Louise, Duchess of Fife, and the Duke of Fife, the groom's sister and brother-in-law 
 Princess Victoria of Wales, the groom's sister 
 Princess Maud of Wales, the groom's sister 
 The Duke and Duchess of Edinburgh, the groom's paternal uncle and aunt
 Princess Victoria Melita of Edinburgh, the groom's first cousin 
 Princess Alexandra of Edinburgh, the groom's first cousin 
 Princess Beatrice of Edinburgh, the groom's first cousin 
 The Duke and Duchess of Connaught and Strathearn, the groom's paternal uncle and aunt
 Princess Margaret of Connaught, the groom's first cousin 
 Prince Arthur of Connaught, the groom's first cousin 
 Princess Patricia of Connaught, the groom's first cousin 
 The Empress Frederick, Queen Mother of Prussia's family:
 Prince and Princess Henry of Prussia, the groom's first cousins (representing the German Emperor)
 Grand Duchess Alice of Hesse and by Rhine's family:
 Princess and Prince Louis of Battenberg, the groom's first cousin and her husband Princess Alice of Battenberg, the groom's first cousin once removed The Grand Duke of Hesse and by Rhine, the groom's first cousin Princess and Prince Christian of Schleswig-Holstein, the groom's paternal aunt and uncle Prince Albert of Schleswig-Holstein, the groom's first cousin Princess Helena Victoria of Schleswig-Holstein, the groom's first cousin The Princess Louise, Marchioness of Lorne and Marquess of Lorne, the groom's paternal aunt and uncle Princess and Prince Henry of Battenberg, the groom's paternal aunt and uncle Prince Alexander of Battenberg, the groom's first cousin Princess Victoria Eugenie of Battenberg, the groom's first cousin The King and Queen of Denmark, the groom's maternal grandparents Prince Valdemar of Denmark, the groom's maternal uncleThe Empress of All the Russias' family: The Tsarevich of Russia, the groom's first cousin (representing the Emperor of Russia)
 The Hereditary Prince of Hohenlohe-Langenburg, the groom's half-second cousin Prince Albert of Belgium, the groom's paternal second cousin, once removed (representing the King of the Belgians) 
 Prince Philipp of Saxe-Coburg and Gotha, the groom's paternal second cousin, once removed (representing the Duke of Saxe-Coburg and Gotha)
Countess Feodora Gleichen, the groom's second cousinCountess Helena Gleichen,  the groom's second cousin 
Countess Victoria Gleichen, the groom's second cousinBride's family
 The Duke and Duchess of Teck, the bride's parents Prince Adolphus of Teck, the bride's brother Prince Francis of Teck, the bride's brother Prince Alexander of Teck, the bride's brother The Duke of Cambridge, the bride's maternal uncle 
 Col. George FitzGeorge, the bride's first cousin 
 Cap. and Mrs. Adolphus FitzGeorge, the bride's first cousin and his wife 
 Col. Augustus FitzGeorge, the bride's first cousin 
 The Grand Duchess and Grand Duke of Mecklenburg-Strelitz, the bride's maternal aunt and uncleOther foreign royalty
Prince and Princess Edward of Saxe-Weimar-Eisenach (representanting the Grand Duke of Saxe-Weimar-Eisenach)
The Maharaja of Bhavnagar
The Raja of Kapurthala
The Thakur Sahib of Morbi
The Thakur Sahib and Ranee Sahib of Gondal

Envoys and ambassadors
Count Ferdinand von Zeppelin (representing the King of Württemberg)
HE the Russian Ambassador and Mme. de Staal
HE the German Ambassador
HE the Turkish Ambassador
HE the Austro-Hungarian Ambassador and Countess Deym
HE the Italian Ambassador and Countess Tornielli
HE the Spanish Ambassador
HE the United States Ambassador and Mrs. Bayard
HE the Belgian Minister and Mme. Solvyns
HE the Danish Minister and Mme. de Bille
HE the Portuguese Minister
HE the Romanian Minister
The Greek Chargé d'Affaires and Mme. Romanos

Politicians
The Prime Minister and First Lord of the Treasury and Mrs. Gladstone
The Lord Chancellor and Lady Herschell
The Chancellor of the Exchequer and Lady Harcourt
The Chief Commissioner of Works and Lady Constance Shaw-Lefevre
The Lord President of the Council and Secretary of State for India and the Countess of Kimberley
The Secretary of State for the Home Department
The Secretary of State for Foreign Affairs
The Secretary of State for War and Mrs. Campbell-Bannerman
The First Lord of the Admiralty and The Countess Spencer
The Secretary of State for Scotland and Lady Trevelyan
The Chief Secretary for Ireland
The Chancellor of the Duchy of Lancaster and Mrs. Bryce

Royal Household
The Marquess and Marchioness of Breadalbane, Lord Steward and his wife
The Lord and Lady Carrington, Lord Chamberlain and his wife
Sir Patrick Grant, Gold Stick-in-Waiting
The Lord Vernon, Captain of the Honourable Corps of Gentlemen-at-Arms
The Lord Kensington, Captain of the Yeomen of the Guard
The Earl of Chesterfield, Treasurer of the Household
George Leveson-Gower, Comptroller of the Household
The Right Honourable Charles Spencer, Vice-Chamberlain of the Household
John Clayton Cowell, Master of the Household
The Lord Ribblesdale, Master of the Buckhounds
The Dowager Duchess of Roxburghe, Acting Mistress of the Robes
The Dowager Lady Churchill, Lady of the Bedchamber
Lord Camoys, Lord-in-waiting
Sir Albert Woods, Garter Principal King of Arms
The Lord Suffield, Lord-in-Waiting to the Prince of Wales 
The Lord and Lady Colville of Culross, Chamberlain to the Princess of Wales, and his wife 

Clergy
The Archbishop of Canterbury
The Bishop of London
The Bishop of Rochester

Other Guests
The Duke of Norfolk, Earl Marshal
The Duchess of Leeds
The Duke and Duchess of Devonshire
The Duke and Duchess of Rutland 
The Duke and Duchess of Buccleuch
The Duke and Duchess of Argyll, father and stepmother of the groom's uncle by marriage'' 
The Duke and Duchess of Portland
The Duke and Duchess of Abercorn
The Marquess and Marchioness of Salisbury
The Earl of Mount Edgcumbe
The Earl and Countess of Lathom 
The Viscount and Viscountess Cross 
The Lord and Lady Halsbury 
Lord and Lady George Hamilton 
The Speaker of the House of Commons
The Right Hon. George Goschen and Mrs. Goschen 
The Right Hon. Joseph Chamberlain and Mrs. Chamberlain 
The Right Hon. Arthur Balfour

References

Sources
 
 

George, Duke Of York, and Mary Of Teck
1893 in London
Marriage, unions and partnerships in England
George V
Mary of Teck
July 1893 events
George, Duke Of York, and Mary Of Teck